William Henry Roever (16 May 1874, St. Louis – 31 January 1951, St. Louis) was an American applied mathematician.

Roever received in 1897 a bachelor's degree in mechanical engineering from Washington University in St. Louis. He received an A.M. in 1904 and a Ph.D. in mathematics in 1906 from Harvard University with advisor Maxime Bôcher and thesis Brilliant points. Roever taught astronomy from 1899 to 1901 at Washington University in St. Louis and mathematics from 1905 to 1908 at Massachusetts Institute of Technology. He then returned to Washington University in St. Louis to teach mathematics and later became the chair of the department of mathematics.

He was an Invited Speaker of the ICM in 1924 in Toronto.

Selected publications

References

1874 births
1951 deaths
20th-century American mathematicians
McKelvey School of Engineering alumni
Harvard University alumni
Washington University in St. Louis alumni
Washington University in St. Louis faculty
Washington University in St. Louis mathematicians
Scientists from St. Louis
Mathematicians from Missouri
MIT School of Humanities, Arts, and Social Sciences faculty